{{Infobox television
| image                = Annamalai (2002 TV series).png
| caption              = 
| genre                = Soap opera
| creator              = Radikaa Sarathkumar
| based_on             =
| writer               = Story:C. J. BaskarScreenplay:Babu YogeswaranSaiprakash K.VijayanDialogues:Babu YogeswaranSaiprakash K.Vijayan
| creative_director    = Radikaa Sarathkumar
| director             = C. J. Baskar(1-278) Sundar K. Vijayan(279-757)
| starring             = Radikaa Sarathkumar  Sivakumar  Jyothi Lakshmi  Deepa Venkat  Kuyili  Viji Chandrasekhar  Ponvannan  Shanmugasundaram  Ajay Rathnam  Devadarshini  Shyam Ganesh  Vijay Adhiraj Kalyani
| country              = India
| language             = Tamil
| num_seasons          = 3
| num_episodes         = 757
| list_episodes        = 
| producer             = Radikaa Sarathkumar
| company              = Radaan Mediaworks
| theme_music_composer = Dhina(Title Song)Kiran(Background Score)
| opentheme            = Tamil - "Uyirgal Pirappathu" (Vocals)K. S. ChithraKKM. L. R. Karthikeyan                Telugu- "Manasu Unnathi" (Vocals)SPBSwarnalatha
| cinematography       = Sakthi Saravanan(1-251) Pons Chandra (252-757)
| editor               = T.Parthasarathy
| camera               = Multi-camera
| runtime              = approx. 20-22 minutes per episode
| channel              = Sun TV
| first_aired          = 
| last_aired           =  
}}Annamalai is an Indian Tamil-language soap opera that aired Monday through Friday on Sun TV from 21 February 2002 to 21 January 2005. The series ended with 757 episodes.

The show starred Sivakumar, Raadhika Sarathkumar, Jyothi Lakshmi, Kuyili, Viji Chandrasekhar, Ponvannan, Shanmugasundaram, Ajay Rathnam, Devadarshini, Shyam Ganesh, Vijay Adhiraj, Deepa Venkat and among others, produced by Radaan Mediaworks Raadhika and is directed by C.J. Bhaskar and Sundar K. Vijayan. It was dubbed into Telugu as Sivayya'' and broadcast on Gemini TV.

Plot
The story involves the long-term dispute between the two families who are considered as rivals for the ownership of Azhvarkurichi's Annamalaiyar temple for many generations. It is currently headed by Pattalathar Ammaiyappa and Gandhimadhi of the Ratnagiri family. Annamalai is the only daughter of Pattalathar and he named her after a temple's deity. The reason of rivalry between Pattalathar's family and Ratnagiri's family is because, one of the Gandhimathi's ancestor had lost the temple's ownership in gambling to the Pattalathar family. Since then, the two families fight for the temple.

The trouble unfolds when Ulaganathan (Gandhimadhi's son and heir to the property) falls in love with Annamalai. Using this opportunity, Gandhimadhi demands the Pattalathar's family to transfer the property deeds of the Annamalaiyar temple to her family after which Ulaganathan will marry Annamalai. Thavasi the eldest son of Patalathar is the one who holds the deeds of the Annamalaiyar temple. Thavasi is very fond of her sister Annamalai and for the sake of her happiness, he promises to transfer the deeds of Annamalaiyar temple to Gandhimadhi's family without the knowledge of Pattalathar.

After which Ulaganathan and Annamalai are married. Then the serial takes a turn when a murder occurs in their village and with schemes of Paarkavi who is the servant of Ghandimadhi, Annamalai faces a series of hurdles and problems, but still loves and cares for her family.

The story later portrays as to how she acts as an important character in building a bridge and ending all the misunderstandings the two families have had between them.

Cast

Main Cast
 Sivakumar as Thavasi
 Radikaa Sarathkumar as Annamalai (Thavasi's sister)
 Neena as Young Annamalai 
 Ponvannan as Gomathi Nayagam
 Riyaz Khan/Ravi Raghavendra as Nallasivam (Pattalathar's third son)
 Viji Chandrasekhar as Shanthi (Gomathi's sister)
 Shyam Ganesh as Ulaganathan (Annamalai and Shanthi's husband)
 SPB Charan as Young Ulaganathan 
 Prem as Nambi (Pattalathar's last son) 
 Kuyili as Visalam Thavasi (Thavasi's wife)
 Shanmugasundaram as Pattalathar alias Ammaiyappan (Thavasi, Nallasivam, Annamalai, Nambi, Gomathinayagam and Santhi's father)
 Jyothi Lakshmi as Gandhimadhi (Ulaganathan and Valliammai's mother)
 Devadarshini as Valliammai (Ulaganathan's sister)
 Ajay Rathnam as Anbhazhagan
 Manjari Vinodhini as Tamizharasi Nallasivam (Anbhazhagan's sister and Nallasivam's wife)
 Vijay Adhiraj as Anwar (Annamalai's friend)

Pattalathar Family
 Shanmugasundaram as Pattalathar alias Ammaiyappan (Thavasi, Nallasivam, Annamalai, Nambi, Gomathinayagam and Santhi's father)
 Meera Krishnan as Thangamma (Pattalathar's second wife and Gomathi Nayagam and Santhi's mother)
 Sivakumar as Thavasi (Pattalathar's first son) 
 Ponvannan as Gomathi Nayagam (Pattalathar's second son)
 Riyaz Khan/Ravi Raghavendra as Nallasivam (Pattalathar's third son)
 Viji Chandrasekhar as Shanthi (Pattalathar's first daughter)
 Raadhika Sarathkumar as Annamalai (Pattalathar's second daughter)
 Neena as  Young Annamalai 
 Pream as Nambi (Pattalathar's last son) 
 Kuyili as Visalam Thavasi (Thavasi's wife)
 Arun Prabu Purushothaman as Sivakumar (Thavasi and Visalam's son)
 Kalyani as Suriya (Annamalai's daughter)
 Pasi Sathya as Sankari Paati (Pattalathar's elder sister)

Gandhimadhi Family

 Jyothi Lakshmi as Gandhimadhi (Ulaganathan and Valliammai's mother)
 Shyam Ganesh as Ulaganathan (Gandhimadhi's son and Annamalai and Santhi's husband)
S.P.B Charan as Young Ulaganathan
 Devadarshini as Valliammai alias Valli (Gandhimadhi's daughter and Gomathi's wife)

Anbhazhagan Family

 Ajay Rathnam as Anbhazhagan
 Manjari Vinodhini as Tamizharasi Nallasivam (Anbhazhagan's sister and Nallasivam's wife)
 Sindhu as Thulasi Anbhazhagan (Anbhazhagan's wife)

Mandiramoorthy Family

 Poovilangu Mohan as Mandiramoorthy alias Kangaaniyaar
 Sonia as Chellamma, Mandiramoorthy's wife
 Sanjeev as Vinayagam "Vinay" (Mandiramoorthy's elder son)
 Venkat as Subramani "Subbu" (Mandiramoorthy's second son, Vinay's twin brother)
 Shobana as Mandiramoorthy's mother-in-law, Chellamma and Poongodi's mother and Vinay and Subbu's maternal grandmother. 
 Sivakavitha as Poongodi (Chellamma's sister and Mandiramoorthy's sister in law)
 Raani as Meena (Vinayagam's wife)

Anwar Family

 Vijay Adhiraj as Anwar (Annamalai's friend) 
 Prithi as Nargis (Anwar's sister)
 Devi Priya as Maryam Anwar (Anwar's wife)
 Dev Anand as Basheer (Nargis' husband)

Kathiresan Family

 Bhanu Prakash as Kathiresan alias Kathir (Jeeva, Jyothi and Jhansi's father)
 Nandakumar as Sathappan (Kathir's elder brother)
 Deepa Venkat as Jeeva (Kathir's first daughter and Annamalai's adoptive daughter)
 Iswarya as Jyothi (Kathir's second daughter and Annamalai's adoptive daughter)
 Pooja as Jhansi (Kathir's last daughter, Annamalai's adoptive daughter and Nambi's wife)

Sakthi Family

 N. Santhanam/Sureshwar as Sakthi (Jeeva's husband)
 Vizhuthugal Santhanam as Sakthi's father
 Bombay Gnanam/Revathee Shankar as Sakthi's mother
 Cheenu Mohan as Sakthi's brother
 Shobana as Shobhana (Sakthi's sister-in-law)
 Latha Rao/ Geethalakshmi as Latha (Sakthi's sister)

Diwakar Family

 Sai Prashanth as Diwakar
 Idichapuli Selvaraj as Diwakar's father
 Gauthami Vembunathan as Diwakar's mother
 Priyanka as Sheela (Diwakar's sister)

Miscellaneous

 Pollachi Babu as Santhanam
 Sadhasivam as Nellaiappan
 K. S. Jayalakshmi as Bhargavi (Gandhimadhi's servant)
 Ramachandran as Nagaraj
 Keerthana as Indumathy
 Delhi Kumar as Seshadri (Pattalathar's legal advisor)
 Nagesh Krishnamoorthi as Krishnamachari (Gandhimadhi's legal advisor)
 Siva as Basha
 Raviraj as Arumugam
 Mali as G.D. (Anwar's friend)
 Vijay Sarathy as Gowri Shankar ( Ulaganathan's best friend)
 Kalpana Sri as Sumathi (Annamalai's best friend and  Gowri Shankar's wife)
 Balu Anand as Pushpadas, A fraudulent bangle seller
 Bhavana as Meenakshi (Ulaganathan's cousin)
 Shanthi Williams as Meenakshi's mother
 Devaraj as Meenakshi's father

Original soundtrack

Title song
It was written by famous lyricist Vairamuthu. It was sung by K. S. Chithra, KK and M. L. R. Karthikeyan.

Soundtrack

International broadcast
The Series was released on 11 February 2002 on Sun TV. The Show was also broadcast internationally on Channel's international distribution. It aired in Sri Lanka, South East Asia, Middle East, United States, Canada, Europe, Oceania, South Africa and Sub Saharan Africa on Sun TV. The show's episodes were released on YouTube channel Radaan Media from 2013.

  It aired in the Indian state of Andhra Pradesh on Gemini TV dubbed in Telugu language as Sivayya.
  In Sri Lanka Tamil Channel on Shakthi TV. It was aired Monday to Friday at 8:30PM.
  In United Kingdom Tamil Channel on Deepam TV.

References

External links
 Official Website 
 Sun TV on YouTube
 Sun TV Network 
 Sun Group 

Sun TV original programming
2002 Tamil-language television series debuts
2000s Tamil-language television series
Tamil-language television shows
2005 Tamil-language television series endings